Kirsti Tiina Orvokki Nopola (born September 5, 1955, in Helsinki) is a Finnish author of children's literature, best known for her work with her sister Sinikka Nopola on the series Hayflower and Quiltshoe, and Ricky Rapper.

References 

1955 births
Living people
Finnish writers